Stephen James (born 31 March 1965) is  a former Australian rules footballer who played with Richmond in the Victorian Football League (VFL).

Notes

External links 
		
		
		
		
		

Living people
1965 births
Australian rules footballers from Victoria (Australia)
Richmond Football Club players
Box Hill Football Club players